Aschau (Chiemgau) station is a railway station in the municipality of Aschau im Chiemgau, located in the Rosenheim district in Bavaria, Germany.

The main building at Hans-Clarin-Platz was built in 1884 and was declared as a state cultural heritage monument (file# D-1-87-114-1).

References

Buildings and structures completed in 1884
Railway stations in Bavaria
Buildings and structures in Rosenheim (district)